The title Kazakhstani Footballer of the Year (Қазақстанның ең үздік футболшысы) has been awarded in Kazakhstan since 1992. The award is determined by a poll of Kazakhstani professional journalists, football coaches, specialists, veterans and captains of playing teams of Premier League. Generally there are two different pools. The first one is conducted by the Football Federation (1992–2005, 2008) and others are conducted by football journal GOAL (starting from 1999) and sports.kz (starting from 2011).

Annual Awards

Monthly Awards
Web portal sports.kz holds "Almaz" monthly award for the best players since 2011 season.

References

Association football player of the year awards by nationality
       
Awards established in 1992
1992 establishments in Kazakhstan
Kazakhstani awards
Annual events in Kazakhstan
Association football player non-biographical articles